David Cohen was the Deputy Commissioner of Intelligence for the New York City Police Department. He was the first to be appointed to this position, created by the city government in response to the September 11 attacks. He used to be Deputy Director of CIA for Operations (DDO) in the U.S. Central Intelligence Agency (CIA). He worked briefly in the private sector following his career in the CIA, doing global risk assessment for the American International Group. He retired from the New York City Police Department in December 2013. Former CBS correspondent John Miller succeeded him.

External links
New Yorker article on the NYPD

People of the Central Intelligence Agency
Deputy New York City Police Commissioners
Living people
Year of birth missing (living people)